Caravantius, an Illyrian, was half brother to Gentius, the last Illyrian king of the Ardiaean State. In 168 BC he fought with his brother against the Cavii.

References

Bibliography 
The Illyrians by J. J. Wilkes, 1992 

Illyrian people